The Poland national baseball team is the national baseball team of Poland. The team competes in the bi-annual European Baseball Championship. 

In 2016, Poland won the European Baseball Championship Group C tournament in Miejska Górka, Poland, defeating Romania 7-1 in the final. The team went undefeated in the tournament overall, with 5 wins.

Roster
Poland's roster for the European Baseball Championship Qualifier 2022, the last official competition in which the team took part.

Tournament results
European Junior Baseball Championship

European Youth Baseball Championship

European Juveniles Baseball Championship

External links
 Poland baseball official site
 Did Baseball Come to the US from Poland?

References

National baseball teams in Europe
baseball
Baseball in Poland